Events from the year 1816 in Sweden

Incumbents
 Monarch – Charles XIII

Events

 Sweden joins the Holy Alliance.
 Inauguration of the Segerlindska teatern in Gothenburg.

Births

 3 February - Carl Olof Rosenius, preacher, author and editor  (died 1868)
 18 March - Louise von Fersen, heiress (died 1879)
 12 June – Nils Blommér, painter (died 1853)
 23 June – Fredrik Wilhelm Scholander, architect, painter and composer (died 1881)
 2 July - Wilhelmina Josephson, pianist  (died 1906) 
 20 September – Fredrik August Dahlgren, writer (died 1895)
 - Jeanette Berglind, sign language teacher and principal (died 1903)
 - Fredrika Limnell, salonnière, women's right activist, philanthropist (died 1897)
 - Aurore Storckenfeldt, educator  (died 1900)
 - Edvard Stjernström, stage actor and theater director (died 1877)

Deaths

 14 January – Rutger Macklean, a driving figure in the reorganization of agricultural lands in Sweden that made possible large-scale farming with its economy of scale (born 1742)
 24 January – Pehr Hörberg, artist (born 1746)
 6 February – Henrik Gahn
 11 February – Sophie Piper, courtier (born 1757)
 27 July – Olof Tempelman, architect (born 1745)

References

 
Years of the 19th century in Sweden
Sweden